The Skull Collectors is Hibria's second album, released in Japan in late 2008 and America in February 2009.

Track listing
 "Tiger Punch"  – 4:14
 "Reborn from the Ashes"  – 4:50
 "Screaming Ghost"  – 5:15
 "Sea of Revenge"  – 4:42
 "The Anger Inside"  – 4:53
 "Devoted to Your Fear"  – 6:40
 "The Skull Collectors"  – 5:15
 "Burning All the Flags" – 5:12
 "Wings of Wax" – 8:37

Credits
Iuri Sanson - Vocals
Diego Kasper - Guitars
Abel Camargo - Guitars
Marco Panichi - Bass
Eduardo Baldo - Drums
 All songs composed and performed by Abel Camargo, Diego Kasper, Iuri Sanson and Marco Panichi 
 Lyrics by Marco Panichi 
 Vocals and Drums recorded at Estudio 1000 – Porto Alegre/Brasil by Fábio Lentino 
 Guitars, Bass and Synths recorded at Gemini Studios – Porto Alegre/Brasil by Diego Kasper 
 Mixed and Mastered at Indiscreet Audio Studios – Ostfildern/Germany by Achim Kohler 
 Produced by Diego Kasper and Marco Panichi

Note
Screaming Ghost (Demo Version) is not present on all versions of the album.

References

2008 albums